Blue's Big City Adventure is a 2022 live-action/animated musical comedy film based on the Nick Jr. television series Blue's Clues & You!. Directed by Matt Stawski, the film stars Traci Paige Johnson as the voice of Blue, alongside Josh Dela Cruz,  Donovan Patton, and Steve Burns. The film follows Josh and Blue as they travel to New York City to audition for a Broadway musical.

It was released on Paramount+ on November 18, 2022, and received positive reviews from critics.

Premise
Josh and Blue travel to New York City to audition for a Broadway musical. However, they end up getting lost as a result of Josh forgetting to bring his Handy-Dandy Notebook, and now their friends must travel to find them with the help of Josh’s cousins Steve and Joe, Blue’s previous companions.

Cast

Voice cast

Live-action cast

Production
On July 12, 2021, it was reported that a movie based on Blue's Clues & You! will be made to mark the 25th anniversary of the Blue's Clues franchise. Directed by Matt Stawski and written by Angela Santomero and Liz Maccie, the film began production in summer 2021. On February 15, 2022, the title was revealed as Blue's Big City Adventure.

Soundtrack 

The film's soundtrack album was released on digital platforms by Republic Records Kids & Family label, on the same day. To promote it, a single version of  “On Our Way” was released on October 7, 2022.

Release
The film's trailer was released on October 3, 2022. Blue's Big City Adventure was released on Paramount+ on November 18, 2022. In a promotion for the film sponsored by Nickelodeon, minor league ice hockey team, Atlanta Gladiators wore Blue's Clues jerseys for their match against the Orlando Solar Bears on November 4, 2022. The film is scheduled to be released on DVD on March 28, 2023.

Reception 
On the review aggregator site Rotten Tomatoes, 80% of five critics' reviews have given the film a positive review, with an average rating of 7.3/10.

Marco Vito Oddo of Collider gave the film a "B" rating, writing "As a result, Blue's Big City Adventure is a movie aimed at preschoolers that's also enjoyable for adults, with exciting musical numbers that help break the simple story and explore the street art history of New York City." In a positive review, Calum Marsh of The New York Times praised Dela Cruz's performance, saying he brought "unbridled charisma to a role that is basically a glorified kindergarten teacher". Nate Adams of The Only Critic wrote, "A harmless, colorful and cheery addition to the Blue's Clues canon, Blue's Big City Adventure has something for everyone."

See also
 List of Blue's Clues characters

References

External links 

Blue's Big City Adventure on Paramount+

2022 films
American musical comedy films
American films with live action and animation
Animated films based on animated series
Animated films set in New York City
Films about dogs
Films based on television series
Nickelodeon animated films
Nickelodeon Movies films
Paramount+ original films